Metagarista is a genus of moths of the family Noctuidae. The genus was erected by Francis Walker in 1854.

Species
 Metagarista aziyade Vuillot, 1892
 Metagarista maenas Herrich-Schäffer, [1853]
 Metagarista subcrocea Wiltshire, 1983
 Metagarista triphaenoides Walker, 1854

References

Agaristinae